Tiziana Scandaletti, born in Padua, is an Italian soprano particularly active in chamber music and contemporary classical music.

Biography 
After receiving her music diploma in vocal performance from the Vicenza Conservatory and her advanced degree in Music History from Padua University, both of them with top marks, she continued her studies with Nino Albarosa, René Clemencich, Alan Curtis, Magda Olivero, Virginio Puecher, Andrea von Ramm and Susanna Ghione, winning national and international prices.

Numerous recordings for CD labels include: Ariston-Ricordi, Curci (Du Dunkelheit by Giacomo Manzoni, dedicated to her), Edipan, Nuova Era (two monographic CDs on Giorgio Federico Ghedini and other two on Alfredo Casella and Franco Alfano), Stradivarius (six CDs La voce contemporanea in Italia - Voll. 1, 2, 3, 4, 5, 6 and one CD La voce crepuscolare).

Tiziana Scandaletti has collaborated with theaters such as Teatro alla Scala in Milan and prestigious Institutions like Santa Cecilia Academy in Rome, with an international activity in chamber music as soprano of the Duo Alterno, with whom she performed hundreds of concerts and masterclasses all around the world.

Recent activities include tours in Europe, Asia, Australia and America, performing at Gasteig in Munich, Unerhoerte Musik in Berlin, Xinghai Concert Hall in Canton, Liaoning Grand Theatre in Shenyang, Opera Theater in Ulan Bator, 37th International Composers' Symposium of the University of New Mexico in Albuquerque, Artlink Festival in Belgrade and SoundaXis Festival in Toronto. She has also presented numerous masterclasses and concert lectures in many important conservatories and universities (Beijing Central Conservatory, Stanford University, University of California, Berkeley, Portland State University, Wilfrid Laurier University, Kyoto University, etc.).

Many composers have written pieces for her, including: Marcello Abbado, Fabio Cifariello Ciardi, Alberto Colla, James Dashow, Ada Gentile, Richard Herman, Paola Livorsi, Giacomo Manzoni, Ennio Morricone, Riccardo Piacentini, Alessandro Solbiati, Fabio Vacchi, Dmitri Yanov-Yanovski.

She has written many musicology articles which have in Italian publications like Cleup, Curci, Il Saggiatore, Il Santo, Neri Pozza, Il Mulino. She currently teaches Vocal Chamber Music at the Piacenza Conservatory.

Discography 

 1993 - Lipso (Venezia alata CDVA 01)
 1993 - Nella profondità dell'anima (Ariston-Ricordi ARCL CD 34)
 1996 - Musiche in esposizione - voll. 1 e 2 (Rive-Gauche Concerti - CRIM)
 1997 - La crava mangia 'l muri (Datum-Stradivarius DAT 80006)
 1998 - Mal'akhim (Nuova Era (CD 7336)
 1999 - Giacomo Manzoni. Du Dunkelheit (Curci E. 11326 C.)
 1999 - Musiche dell'aurora (Fondazione Italiana per la Fotografia - Rive-Gauche Concerti RG 00005)
 1999 - Shahar (Curci E. 11351 C.)
 2000 - Musiche per Pellizza da Volpedo (Nuova Era CD 7351)
 2000 - Giorgio Federico Ghedini. Musica sacra (Nuova Era CD 7354)
 2001 - Arie condizionate (Fondazione Italiana per la Fotografia - Rive-Gauche Concerti RG 00009)
 2001 - Giorgio Federico Ghedini. Canti e strambotti (Nuova Era CD 7365)
 2002 - Alfredo Casella. Liriche (Nuova Era CD 7371)
 2003 - Treni persi (Province of Turin - Rive-Gauche Concerti RG 00012)
 2004 - Mina miniera mia (Province of Turin - Rive-Gauche Concerti RG 00014)
 2004 - Musiche della Reggia di Venaria Reale (Piedmont Region - Rive-Gauche Concerti RG 00015)
 2004 - Franco Alfano. Liriche da Tagore (Nuova Era CD 7388)
 2005 - La voce contemporanea in Italia - vol. 1 (Stradivarius STR 33708)
 2006 - La voce contemporanea in Italia - vol. 2 (Stradivarius (STR 33743)
 2007 - La voce contemporanea in Italia - vol. 3 (Stradivarius STR 33769)
 2007 - Italienischer Gesangsabend mit dem Duo Alterno (Steirischer Tonkünstler Bund STB 07/07)
 2009 - La voce contemporanea in Italia - vol. 4 (Stradivarius STR 33833)
 2010 - La voce crepuscolare (Stradivarius STR 33839)
 2011 - La voce contemporanea in Italia - vol. 5 (Stradivarius STR 33895)
 2013 - La voce contemporanea in Italia - vol. 6'' (Stradivarius STR 33976)

External links 
 Official WEB site
 Duo Alterno's WEB site

Year of birth missing (living people)
Living people
Musicians from Padua
Italian operatic sopranos
Contemporary classical music performers
20th-century Italian women opera singers
21st-century Italian women opera singers